Czerniewice  is a village in the administrative district of Gmina Choceń, within Włocławek County, Kuyavian-Pomeranian Voivodeship, in central Poland. It is located in the historic region of Kuyavia.

There is a train station in the village.

History
During the German occupation (World War II), the occupiers carried out expulsions of Poles from Czerniewice in 1940–1941. Expelled Poles were initially sent to a transit camp in Łódź and then deported to the General Government in the more eastern part of German-occupied Poland, while their houses were handed over to German colonists as part of the Lebensraum policy.

References

Czerniewice